SuperStar Search Slovakia is a casting television show based on the popular British show Pop Idol. The show is a contest to determine the best young singer in Slovakia. It was broadcast by the national TV network STV in the late 2004 and early 2005. The first season premiered on October 29, 2004, and concluded on April 15, 2005. The main show was aired on Fridays, the accompanying SuperStar Search Slovakia Magazine was broadcast on Tuesdays and Thursdays, premiering on December 14, 2004.

Judges and hosts

Judges
The show had four judges; singers and musicians Ladislav Lučenič and Pavol Habera, a music producer Lenka Slaná, and a radio personality Július Viršík. Lučenič served as the head-judge and had the main vote.

Hosts
The regional auditions and live shows were hosted by the then radio presenters Adela Banášová and Martin Rausch (referred to by his radio nickname, Pyco). The accompanying Superstar Search Slovakia Magazine was hosted by Banášová and Rausch's radio associate, Branislav Ciberej (aka Bruno). The magazine covered the making of the show and featured interviews with contestants, judges or musicians.

Regional auditions
Auditions were held in Bratislava, Košice, Banská Bystrica, Žilina in the summer of 2004.

Divadlo (Theatre)
The best 100 singers from the regional auditions advanced to Divadlo (Theatre). The contestants first emerged on stage in groups of 9 or 10 and performed a solo unaccompanied. Those who did not impress the judges were eliminated after the group members finished their individual performances. The remaining contestants then formed same-sex trios and had to perform given songs accompanied with piano. The female trios sang "Modrá" by Jana Kirschner, the male trios performed "Voda, čo ma drží nad vodou" by Elán. The best 50 contestants made it to the semi-finals.

Semi-finals
The 50 contestants who reached this stage were referred to in the show as the semi-finalists. They were divided into groups of 10 and performed live from the studio. From each group, two people advanced to the final round, based on viewers' votes. Below are the five semi-final groups with contestants listed in their performance order.

Group 1

Group 2

Group 3

Group 4

Group 5

Wild Card Round

Finalists

Peter Konček died in a car accident on January 6, 2012.

Finals
Eleven contestants made it to the finals. The first single recorded by TOP 11 is called "Kým vieš snívať" ("As Long as You Can Dream") and it was composed by the judge Pavol Habera (music) and a Slovak poem writer Daniel Hevier (lyrics). Each final night had its own theme. Audiences could vote for the contestants from the beginning of the show via text messages. The voting ended during the result show on the same day. The best 6 contestants later recorded another single, "Teraz je ten správny čas" ("Now It Is the Right Time").

Top 11 – My Idol

Top 10 – Ballads

Top 9 – 1970s Disco

Top 8 – Hits of Year 2004

Top 7 – Rock Edition

Top 6 – Duets

Top 5 – The Beatles vs Elvis Presley

Top 4 – Slovak Hits

Top 3 – Swing

Top 2 – Grand Final

Elimination chart

Contestants who appeared on other seasons/shows
Richard Vida would later be a finalist on SuperStar Search Slovakia season 2.
Marián Fatrsík would later be a semi-finalist on SuperStar Search Slovakia season 2.
Tünde Gogolová would later be a semi-finalist on SuperStar Search Slovakia season 2.

External links
Fan page of Season 1

Season 01
2004 Slovak television seasons
2005 Slovak television seasons